Oehlen is a surname. Notable people with the surname include:

  (1914–1972), German illustrator and caricaturist
 Albert Oehlen (born 1954), German painter
 Markus Oehlen (born 1956), German artist

See also
 Oehler